Kajava is a surname. Notable people with the surname include:

 Jukka Kajava (1943–2005), Finnish theater and television critic
 Viljo Kajava (1909–1998), Finnish poet and writer

Finnish-language surnames